Gyesan is a district of Gyeyang which is a ward of Incheon, South Korea. It is 4.55 km squared. It was founded in 1946. There are 95,908 people living in Gyesan district. Gyesan's motto is "be a polite citizen." Gyesan is a residential and commercial district.

Notable locations
Gyeongin National University of Education
Gyeongin National University of Education Station  
Gyeyang Mountain
Gyongin Women's University 
Gyeyang City Library 
Gyesan Station 
Gyeyang District Office 
VIPS 
Lotte Mart, Home Plus
Gyesan High School 
Gyesan Sports Center

Gyeyang District
Neighbourhoods in South Korea